is a senior high school for girls in Mita, Minato, Tokyo.

Overview 
Affiliated with Keio University, it is on the grounds of a previous residence of Tokugawa Ieyasu. An annex facility was constructed in 2014.

Notable alumnae
Chiaki Mukai, Astronaut
Kiyoko Okabe, Supreme Court Justice
Yasuko Komiyama, Politician
Ayuko Kato, Politician
Kazuyo Katsuma, Businesswoman 
Mariko Asabuki, Writer
Ayaka Hironaka, TV Asahi Announcer
Misako Konno, Actress
Yuki Shibamoto, Actress
Karin Miyawaki, Fencer

See also
Keio University

References

External links

 Keio Girls Senior High School
 Keio Girls Senior High School 

Girls' schools in Japan
Keio University
High schools in Tokyo
Minato, Tokyo